The Bofors 57 mm m/54 was a wheeled automatic anti-aircraft gun for land based use produced by Bofors and developed from the similar Bofors 57 mm m/50 naval artillery gun. The gun was developed in the 1950s and fielded by the Belgian and Swedish forces. In Swedish service, the gun was known as the 57 mm lvakan m/54.

The m/54 fired a 2.67-kilogram high explosive projectile at a muzzle velocity of 880 meters per second and a rate of fire of 160 rounds per minute. Weighing in at 8.1 tons, the m/54 had an effective range of 4,000 meters. The ballistics of the m/54 at practical air defense altitudes were not particularly superior to those of the Bofors 40 mm AA gun, resulting in relatively few sales of the m/54.

See also
Bofors 57 mm Naval Automatic Gun L/60
Bofors 57 mm Naval Automatic Gun L/70

References

 Christopher Foss (Ed.), Jane's Armour and Artillery 1981-82, London: Jane's Publishing Co. Ltd., 1981.

External links
 www.navweaps.com page on the Bofors m/50 naval 57-mm AA gun

57 mm artillery
Artillery of Sweden
Bofors
Military equipment introduced in the 1950s